IATA delay codes were created to standardise the reporting by airlines of  commercial flight  departure delays.
Previously, every airline had its own system, which made  the sharing and aggregation of flight delay information difficult.   IATA standardised the flight delay reporting format by using codes that attribute cause and responsibility for the delay; this supports aviation administration and logistics and helps to define any penalties arising. These codes are used in movement messages sent electronically by SITA from the departure airport to the destination airport and also in the internal administration of the airlines, airports and ground handling agents.

An aircraft held on the ground incurs costs, consequently airlines plan operations to minimise ground time. It is common practice for airlines and aircraft ground handling to have contracts based on a bonus–malus system, penalising the causative agent for delays caused. Delay code properties cover nine category sets for delay. Each category set can be described using either a two-digit number code or a two letter alpha code; most airlines use the numeric format, but some prefer the alpha. Messaging standards, such as the AHM 780 Aircraft Movement Message specification, specify that only the numeric codes should be used. Many airlines further subdivide the IATA codes with an additional character, for more granular delay analysis, but these are not standardized. In the AHM 780 specification, the two-character numeric-only codes are sent in the DL and EDL elements along with the time assigned to each code (e.g. DL31/62/0005/0015 showing reason 31 for 5 mins and reason 62 for 15 minutes), and the three-character alphanumeric codes are sent in the DLA element (e.g. DLA31C/62A// showing subreason C for code 31 and subreason A for code 62).

Delay codes starting with 0 (internal) 

Delay codes starting with 0 are used for internal airline purposes. Airlines are free to define these codes and to determine particular application fields.

However the following codes are standard, even if some airlines do not use them and create their own customized delay codes:
 00–05: These codes are left blank so that each airline may develop codes specifically to meet their own individual requirements, e.g., 03: "Three-class system" moving curtain.
 06 (OA): No gate/stand availability due to own airline activity
 07: Aircraft connection by maintenance
 08: Aircraft connection by miscellaneous, traffic, marketing flight operations, ground handling, cabin services, etc.
 09 (SG): Scheduled ground time less than declared minimum ground time

Delay codes starting with 1 (passenger/baggage) 

These Codes are used to describe delays caused by Passenger and Baggage handling.

 11 (PD): Late check-in, acceptance of passengers after deadline
 12 (PL): Late check-in, congestion in check-in area
 13 (PE): Check-in error
 14 (PO): Oversales, booking errors
 15 (PH): Boarding, discrepancies and paging, missing checked-in passenger at gate
 16 (PS): Commercial Publicity, Passenger Convenience, VIP, Press, Ground meals and missing personal items
 17 (PC): Catering order, late or incorrect order given to supplier
 18 (PB): Baggage processing, sorting, etc.
 19 (PW): Reduced Mobility, Boarding/Deboarding of passengers with reduced mobility

Delay codes starting with 2 (cargo/mail) 

These Codes are used to describe delays caused by Cargo (21-26) and Mail Handling (27-29).

 21 (CD): Documentation, errors, etc.
 22 (CP): Late positioning
 23 (CC): Late acceptance
 24 (CI): Inadequate packing
 25 (CO): Oversales, booking errors
 26 (CU): Late preparation in warehouse
 27 (CE): Mail Oversales, packing, etc.
 28 (CL): Mail Late positioning
 29 (CA): Mail Late acceptance

Delay codes starting with 3 (handling) 

These Codes are used to describe delays caused by aircraft and ramp handling

 31 (GD): Aircraft documentation late or inaccurate, weight and balance (Loadsheet), general declaration, passenger manifest, etc.
 32 (GL): Loading, Unloading, bulky/special load, cabin load, lack of loading staff
 33 (GE): Loading Equipment, lack of or breakdown, e.g. container pallet loader, lack of staff
 34 (GS): Servicing Equipment, lack of or breakdown, lack of staff, e.g. steps
 35 (GC): Aircraft Cleaning
 36 (GF): Fuelling, Defuelling, fuel supplier
 37 (GB): Catering, late delivery or loading
 38 (GU): ULD, Containers, pallets, lack of or breakdown
 39 (GT): Technical equipment, lack of or breakdown, lack of staff, e.g. pushback

Delay codes starting with 4 (technical) 
These codes are used to describe technical delay reasons.

 41 (TD): Aircraft defects
 42 (TM): Scheduled maintenance, late release
 43 (TN): Non-scheduled maintenance, special checks and / or additional works beyond normal maintenance
 44 (TS): Spares and maintenance equipment, lack of or breakdown
 45 (TA): AOG (Aircraft on ground for technical reasons) Spares, to be carried to another station
 46 (TC): Aircraft change for technical reasons
 47 (TL): Standby aircraft, lack of planned standby aircraft for technical reasons
 48 (TV): Scheduled cabin configuration and version adjustment

Delay codes starting with 5 (damage/failure) 

These Codes are used to describe damage to aircraft and automated equipment failure.

 51 (DF): Damage during flight operations, bird or lightning strike, turbulence, heavy or overweight landing
 52 (DG): Damage during ground operations, collisions (other than during taxiing), loading/offloading damage, contamination, towing, extreme weather conditions.
 55 (ED): Departure Control System, Check-in, weight and balance (loadcontrol), computer system error, baggage sorting, gate-reader error or problems
 56 (EC): Cargo preparation/documentation system
 57 (EF): Flight plans
 58 (EO): Other computer systems

Delay codes starting with 6 (operation) 

These codes are assigned to Operations and Crew caused delays.

 61 (FP): Flight plan, late completion or change of flight documentation
 62 (FF): Operational requirements, fuel, load alteration
 63 (FT): Late crew boarding or departure procedures
 64 (FS): Flight deck crew shortage, Crew rest
 65 (FR): Flight deck crew special request or error not within operational requirements
 66 (FL): Late cabin crew boarding or departure procedures
 67 (FC): Cabin crew shortage 
 68 (FA): Cabin crew error or special request
 69 (FB): Captain request for security check, extraordinary

Delay codes starting with 7 (weather) 

These Codes explain weather caused delays.

 71 (WO): Departure station
 72 (WT): Destination station
 73 (WR): En route or Alternate
 75 (WI): De-Icing of aircraft, removal of ice/snow, frost prevention
 76 (WS): Removal of snow/ice/water/sand from airport/runway
 77 (WG): Ground handling impaired by adverse weather conditions

Delay codes starting with 8 (air traffic control) 

These Codes are used for Air Traffic Control (ATC) Restrictions (81-84) and Airport or Governmental Authorities caused delays.

 81 (AT): ATC restriction en-route or capacity
 82 (AX): ATC restriction due to staff shortage or equipment failure en-route
 83 (AE): ATC restriction at destination
 84 (AW): ATC restriction due to weather at destination
 85 (AS): Mandatory security
 86 (AG): Immigration, Customs, Health
 87 (AF): Airport Facilities, parking stands, ramp congestion, buildings, gate limitations, ...
 88 (AD): Restrictions at airport of destination, airport/runway closed due obstruction, industrial action, staff shortage, political unrest, noise abatement, night curfew, special flights, ...
 89 (AM): Restrictions at airport of departure, airport/runway closed due obstruction, industrial action, staff shortage, political unrest, noise abatement, night curfew, special flights, start-up and pushback, ...

Delay codes starting with 9 (miscellaneous) 

Codes used for reactionary reasons or Miscellaneous.

 91 (RL): Passenger or Load Connection, awaiting load or passengers from another flight. Protection of stranded passengers onto a new flight.
 92 (RT): Through Check-in error, passenger and baggage
 93 (RA): Aircraft rotation,  late arrival of aircraft from another flight or previous sector
 94 (RS): Cabin crew rotation
 95 (RC): Crew rotation, awaiting crew from another flight (flight deck or entire crew) 
 96 (RO): Operations control, rerouting, diversion, consolidation, aircraft change for reasons other than technical
 97 (MI): Industrial action within own airline
 98 (MO): Industrial action outside own airline, excluding ATS
 99 (MX): Miscellaneous, not elsewhere specified

External links
 Standard IATA Delay Codes (AHM730)

Codes, delay
Encodings